Lower Test Valley is a  biological Site of Special Scientific Interest near Totton in Hampshire. It is part of Solent and Southampton Water Ramsar site and  Special Protection Area, and of Solent Maritime Special Area of Conservation. It is a nature reserve managed by the Hampshire and Isle of Wight Wildlife Trust.

The valley has extensive reed beds, tidally flooded creeks, unimproved grassland and scattered willow trees. More than 450 flowering plants have been recorded, including the nationally rare green-flowered helleborine. The reed beds have large populations of wetland breed birds.

There is no access to the reserve at high tide.

References

 

Hampshire and Isle of Wight Wildlife Trust
Sites of Special Scientific Interest in Hampshire
Ramsar sites in England
Special Protection Areas in England
Special Areas of Conservation in England